Keith Marshall Gingery (born September 13, 1969, in Frederick, Maryland) is an American politician and a Republican member of the Wyoming House of Representatives representing District 23 from January 2005 to 2015.

Education
Gingery earned his BS in political science from the University of Wyoming and his JD from the University of Wyoming College of Law.

Elections
2012 Gingery was unopposed for both the August 21, 2012 Republican Primary, winning with 905 votes, and the November 6, 2012 General election, winning with 3,884 votes.
2004 When Republican Representative Clarene Law was term limited (since repealed) and left the District 23 seat open, Gingery won the three-way August 17, 2004 Republican Primary by 68 votes with 587 votes (39.1%), and won the November 2, 2004 General election with 2,623 votes against Democratic nominee Mike Gierau.
2006 Gingery was unopposed for both the August 22, 2006 Republican Primary, winning with 1,343 votes, and the November 7, 2006 General election, winning with 3,066 votes.
2008 Gingery was unopposed for both the August 19, 2008 Republican Primary, winning with 1,182 votes, and the November 4, 2008 General election, winning with 4,131 votes.
2010 Gingery was unopposed for both the August 17, 2010 Republican Primary, winning with 1,473 votes, and the November 2, 2010 General election, winning with 3,061 votes.

References

External links
Official page at the Wyoming Legislature
 

1969 births
Living people
Republican Party members of the Wyoming House of Representatives
Politicians from Frederick, Maryland
People from Jackson, Wyoming
University of Wyoming alumni
University of Wyoming College of Law alumni
Wyoming lawyers